Hong Kong Viceroy Cup was a football competition in Hong Kong held by British American Tobacco. Started in 1969, it was the first football competition in Hong Kong which allowed commercial sponsorship. Together with First Division League, FA Cup and Senior Shield, they were considered as "Big Four" competitions in Hong Kong football circle. Since July 1999, the Hong Kong government has forbidden the sponsorship of sports events by tobacco firms, although the Chinese name of it suggests "Governor", which was the leader of British Hong Kong colony before Hong Kong Handover in 1997. The 29th and the last competition was held in 1998.

Finals

Results

External links 
Hongkong – List of Viceroy Cup Finalists

 

Football cup competitions in Hong Kong
R. J. Reynolds Tobacco Company